Ridley Burton (21 December 1893 – 28 October 1974) was an English professional footballer who played as a wing half.

References

1893 births
1974 deaths
People from Amble
Footballers from Northumberland
English footballers
Association football wing halves
Seaton Delaval F.C. players
Newcastle City F.C. players
Grimsby Town F.C. players
West Stanley F.C. players
Ashington A.F.C. players
English Football League players